Orthosia annulimacula is a species of cutworm or dart moth in the family Noctuidae. It is found in North America.

The MONA or Hodges number for Orthosia annulimacula is 10497.

References

Further reading

 
 
 

Orthosia
Articles created by Qbugbot
Moths described in 1891